Shawn Larell Taggart (born March 26, 1985) is an American former professional basketball player who last played for the Rain or Shine Elasto Painters of the Philippine Basketball Association (PBA).

As a junior power forward/center for the Memphis Tigers he averaged 10.4 PPG and 7.6 RPG in the 2008–09 season. He was a member of the team as a sophomore when the Tigers went to the NCAA National Championship in 2008, which they lost in overtime to the Kansas Jayhawks.

Taggart signed an agent for the NBA draft, but went undrafted. Taggart competed in the 2009 NBA Summer League with the Toronto Raptors.

On November 6, 2012, Taggart joined the Springfield Armor. On January 7, 2013, he was traded to the Santa Cruz Warriors in exchange for Paul Carter. He was then waived by the Warriors on January 8.

In March 2016, Taggart was signed as the new import for GlobalPort Batang Pier of the Philippine Basketball Association in the 2016 PBA Commissioner's Cup, replacing Calvin Walner.

In March 2017, he was signed by the Rain or Shine Elasto Painters as their import for the 2017 PBA Commissioner's Cup.

References

External links
Memphis Tigers bio
Profile at Eurobasket.com

1985 births
Living people
American expatriate basketball people in China
American expatriate basketball people in Israel
American expatriate basketball people in Qatar
American expatriate basketball people in the Philippines
American expatriate basketball people in Spain
American expatriate basketball people in Turkey
American men's basketball players
Basketball players from Richmond, Virginia
CB Murcia players
Centers (basketball)
Hapoel Gilboa Galil Elyon players
Iowa State Cyclones men's basketball players
Ironi Nahariya players
Memphis Tigers men's basketball players
NorthPort Batang Pier players
Power forwards (basketball)
Philippine Basketball Association imports
Rain or Shine Elasto Painters players
Shanxi Loongs players
Springfield Armor players